Daiva Leele (Kannada: ದೈವ ಲೀಲೆ) is a 1962 Indian Kannada film, directed by C. S. Krishna Kumar and produced by R. T. Arasu. The film stars Kalyan Kumar, Sowkar Janaki and T. N. Balakrishna. The film has musical score by B. M. S. Murthy.

Cast
Kalyan Kumar
Sowkar Janaki
T. N. Balakrishna

References

1962 films
1960s Kannada-language films